List of Chairmen of the Astrakhan Oblast Duma

Below is a list of office-holders:

References 

Lists of legislative speakers in Russia
Politics of Astrakhan Oblast